In mathematics, the Ruelle zeta function is a zeta function associated with a dynamical system.  It is named after mathematical physicist David Ruelle.

Formal definition
Let f be a function defined on a manifold M, such that the set of fixed points Fix(f n) is finite for all n > 1.  Further let φ be a function on M with values in d × d complex matrices.  The zeta function of the first kind is

Examples
In the special case d = 1, φ = 1, we have

which is the Artin–Mazur zeta function.

The Ihara zeta function is an example of a Ruelle zeta function.

See also
List of zeta functions

References

 
 
 
 

Zeta and L-functions